Lamo is a surname of Italian origin that may refer to:

Adrian Lamo (1981–2018), American threat analyst
Augusto Lamo Castillo (1938–2002), Spanish football referee
Pierre Lamo (died 1578), Italian painter
Regina de Lamo (1870–1947), Spanish writer, journalist, musician, and teacher

See also 
Lhamo

Surnames of Italian origin